Plenoculus davisi is a species of square-headed wasp in the family Crabronidae. It is found in North America.

Subspecies
These five subspecies belong to the species Plenoculus davisi:
 Plenoculus davisi atlanticus Viereck, 1902
 Plenoculus davisi davisi W. Fox, 1893
 Plenoculus davisi gracilis F. Williams, 1960
 Plenoculus davisi mojavensis F. Williams, 1960
 Plenoculus davisi transversus F. Williams, 1960

References

Crabronidae
Articles created by Qbugbot
Insects described in 1893